Neumark is a town in the Weimarer Land district, in Thuringia, Germany. It is situated 20 km northeast of Erfurt, and 12 km northwest of Weimar. Neumark is the second-least populous town (Stadt) in Germany (after Arnis), and is the least populous in what was formerly East Germany.

History
Within the German Empire (1871-1918), Neumark was part of the Grand Duchy of Saxe-Weimar-Eisenach.

References

Towns in Thuringia
Weimarer Land
Grand Duchy of Saxe-Weimar-Eisenach